James H. "Bill" Finch (1913 in Atlanta – July 28, 2003) was an American Architect and founder of architectural firm FABRAP.

Early life and education
Finch graduated from the Georgia Institute of Technology in 1936 with a BS Architecture.

Career
Finch was also a retired US Marine Lt. Colonel. He saw combat on Iwo Jima and was, at one part in the epic battle, Executive Officer of the battalion in the 28th Regiment which raised the flag on Mount Suribachi. He also saw service in the Korean War.

Known as a modernist, in a city, he was also reported to have disliked excessive parking lots and unburied wires. Major projects he had a hand in include Atlanta Stadium (1965), Five Points MARTA station (1979), Coca-Cola headquarters (1980) and BellSouth tower (1982) (now Tower Square).

References

1913 births
2003 deaths
20th-century American architects
History of Atlanta
Architects from Atlanta
Georgia Tech alumni
United States Marine Corps personnel of World War II